Ipe extensible drawing editor is a free vector graphics editor for creating figures in PDF or EPS format. It can be used for making small figures for inclusion into LaTeX documents as well as making multi-page PDF presentations.
It is developed by Otfried Cheong since 1993 and initially worked on SGI workstations only. Ipe 6 was released in 2003 which changed the file format into XML code embedded into PDF and EPS files. Ipe 7 was released in 2009. Ipe 7 (see below)  can be compiled under Windows, macOS and Unix but binaries are available for many distributions.

Ipe graphics can be stored using either the .ipe or .xml extension. But they can also be stored under the .pdf extension which is the most convenient way to be integrated into LaTeX documents. Most PDF graphics can be converted to .ipe using the pdftoipe tool in order to be enriched with legends using the mathematical LaTeX language.

Ipe lets users draw geometric objects such as polylines, arcs and spline curves and text. Ipe supports use of layers and multiple pages. It can paste bitmap images from clipboard or import from JPEG or BMP, and also through a conversion software it can import PDF figures generated by other software. It differentiates itself from similar programs by including advanced snapping tools and the ability to directly include LaTeX text and equations. Ipe is extensible by use of ipelets, which are plugins written in C++ or Lua.

Snapping 
Several advanced snapping modes can be turned on in order to facilitate producing accurate figures. The current snap location is indicated by a small red cross near the mouse cursor. The following features can be snapped to.

 Vertices
 Boundaries (lines)
 Intersections between lines. This includes curved lines.
 A grid
 Angles

LaTeX 
IPE allows the user to insert text objects containing LaTeX code. This is converted to vector graphics by parsing the output of pdfTeX. This is useful for creating figures to be included in scientific documents which often contain equations. It also results in the same font being used for both the text and figures of the document. This is often not the case if other drawing programs are used.

IPE 7 
IPE 7 is the current version of IPE. The core graphics functionality has been separated into a library libipe. The frontend is now written in Lua and includes powerful and well-documented plugin system. Plugins can be written in Lua or C++. New features include support for clipping paths, gradients, transparency and tiling patterns. Binaries are available for Windows 7 and 8 as well as for some Linux distributions. The OS/X Ipe.app bundle (since version 7.1.1) can be built and shared but is not officially maintained by Otfried Cheong (see the Ipe7 wiki site).

External links 
 
 Ipe at Github
 Ipe7 Wiki
 Article on Ipe published in PracTeX Journal
 The OS/X Fink distributions contain Ipe 6. )
 Ipe can be installed on Macintosh OS X from: Macports

Free vector graphics editors
Graphics software that uses Qt
Lua (programming language)-scriptable software